Mark Kaplan (born 30 December 1953, in Cambridge, Massachusetts) is an American violinist who studied at the Juilliard School under Dorothy DeLay. He is currently a professor at Indiana University's Jacobs School of Music. Before teaching at Indiana, Kaplan taught at UCLA in California.

Kaplan has performed in all the principal cities of Europe, including London, Berlin, Paris, Vienna, Prague, Zürich, Amsterdam, Copenhagen and Milan, as well as the Far East and Australia. In the United States he has played with nearly every major orchestra, including the New York Philharmonic, Los Angeles Philharmonic, Cleveland Orchestra, Philadelphia Orchestra, the National Symphony Orchestra of Washington, D.C., as well as Saint Louis Symphony Orchestra, Pittsburgh Symphony Orchestra, Baltimore Symphony Orchestra, Minnesota Orchestra, Cincinnati Symphony Orchestra, Dallas Symphony Orchestra, and Houston Symphony. In Australia, Kaplan appeared for the Australian Broadcasting Corporation, playing with the Queensland Orchestra in Brisbane, in 2009.

From the Jacobs School of Music website:Mark Kaplan has been professor of violin at the Indiana University Jacobs School of Music since 2005. Prior to that, he served as professor with distinction at UCLA.He has established himself as one of the leading violinists of his generation. His consummate artistry has resulted in solo engagements with nearly every major American orchestra, including the New York and Los Angeles Philharmonic Orchestras, the Cleveland and Philadelphia Orchestras, the Chicago and National Symphony Orchestras, and the symphony orchestras of St. Louis, Pittsburgh, Baltimore, Minnesota, Cincinnati and Indianapolis. He has collaborated with many of the world's foremost conductors, among them Ormandy, Tennstedt, Maazel, Ashkenazi, Dutoit, Bychkov, Conlon, Ivan Fischer, Foster, Gatti, Masur, Rattle, Robertson, Salonen, Semkov, Skrowaczewski, Slatkin and Zinman; and has appeared regularly at festivals such as Aspen, Blossom, Chautauqua, Grant Park, Ravinia, Saratoga and Wolf Trap.Kaplan has also maintained a flourishing international career since his European debut in 1975 when he was asked on short notice to substitute for Pinchas Zuckerman, playing the Bartók Concerto in Cologne under the baton of Lawrence Foster. In subsequent seasons he has made highly acclaimed concerto and recital appearances in all the musical centers of Europe--London, Berlin, Paris, Vienna, Prague, Zurich, Amsterdam, Copenhagen and Milan--as well as in Australia, New Zealand, Malaysia, Hong Kong and Singapore. Among the particularly memorable musical experiences for Mr. Kaplan have been Beethoven violin concerto performances with Klaus Tennstedt together with the New York Philharmonic, Cleveland Orchestra and National Symphony Orchestra, several appearances with the Berlin Philharmonic Orchestra, and his many projects involving the solo works of Bach.In addition to his solo music-making, Kaplan is also devoted to chamber music. He appears with pianist Yael Weiss and cellist Peter Stumpf as the Weiss-Kaplan-Stumpf Trio, with recordings and concerts tours world-wide. Prior to that he performed and recorded extensively for two decades in the Golub-Kaplan-Carr trio, with cellist Colin Carr and the late pianist David Golub.Kaplan has a wide range of repertoire available on compact disc. His second recording of the solo violin works of JS Bach will be issued in early 2016 on Bridge Records, as will a Weiss-Kaplan-Stumpf Trio recording of Fred Lerdahl’s “Times 3”, while 2014 saw the release (also for Bridge) of a CD with new American Piano Trios, joining a 2011 recording of Brahms and Smetana Trios. Other recent recordings include concerti of Berg and Stravinsky, the Lalo Symphonie Espagnole and the Concierto Espagnol of Joan Manen, all under the baton of Lawrence Foster, as well as Lewis Spratlan’s Concertino and the tone poem, Le Ménétrier, by Max d’Ollone. Kaplan's discography also includes the Bartók Violin Concerto No. 2 and Dohnanyi Violin Concerto No. 2, violin concerti of Paganini, Wieniawski and Viotti; the Brahms Double Concerto; Spanish Dances of Sarasate; various works of Bartók including the Solo Sonata; violin and piano sonatas of Schumann with Anton Kuerti; and trios of Brahms, Debussy, Dvorak, Fauré, Mendelssohn, Rachmaninov, Saint-Saens, Schubert, Smetana and Tchaikowsky. The Golub-Kaplan-Carr Trio's recording, on Arabesque Records, of Tchaikovsky and Smetana trios, received an INDIE Award for "Best Classical Album by an Ensemble."Kaplan plays a violin made by Antonio Stradivari in 1685, which is named "The Marquis" after the Marchese Spinola, whose family owned the violin for several generations. He is the father of two musical sons, Edwin Kaplan—a member of the Tesla Quartet, and David Kaplan a piano soloist and faculty member at UCLA.

Notes

Living people
American male violinists
Violin pedagogues
Juilliard School alumni
UCLA Herb Alpert School of Music faculty
Jacobs School of Music faculty
1953 births
Musicians from Cambridge, Massachusetts
21st-century American violinists
21st-century American male musicians